Alexander Eckstein (Novi Sad 1915-1976) was a Professor of Economics who worked at the University of Michigan. 

Eckstein's area of expertise was the Chinese economy and he played a notable role in the Center for Chinese Studies at the University of Michigan and the development of Sino-US diplomacy (the so-called Ping-pong diplomacy) of the 1970s.

Selected publications
 1962, The National Income of Communist China
 1960, Communist China's Economic Development and Foreign Trade
 1975, China's Economic Development: The Interplay of Scarcity and Ideology
 1977, China's Economic Revolution
 1977, Comparison of Economic Systems: Theoretical and Methodological Approaches

References

1915 births
1976 deaths
University of Michigan faculty
American economists
Ritchie Boys